Vasilyevo is a rural locality (a village) in Teplogorskoye Rural Settlement, Velikoustyugsky District, Vologda Oblast, Russia. The population was 19 as of 2002.

Geography 
Vasilyevo is located 71 km southeast of Veliky Ustyug (the district's administrative centre) by road. Slizovitsa is the nearest rural locality.

References 

Rural localities in Velikoustyugsky District